The Neva Cup (previously known as the Kivennapa Ladies' Cup) is a tournament for professional female tennis players played on indoor hardcourts. The event is classified as a $100,000 ITF Women's Circuit tournament and has been held in Saint Petersburg, Russia, since 2012. In 2016, the tournament moved from the outdoor clay courts of the Children's Tennis Center to the indoor courts of Tennis Center Dinamo.

Past finals

Singles

Doubles

References

External links 
 Official website 
 ITF search

ITF Women's World Tennis Tour
Clay court tennis tournaments
Hard court tennis tournaments
Tennis tournaments in Russia
Recurring sporting events established in 2012